The knockout stage of the 2012 CECAFA Cup began on 3 December 2012 with the quarter-finals and ended on 8 December 2012 with the final. Matches were played at the Namboole Stadium and the Lugogo Stadium in Kampala, Uganda.

Format
The knockout stage involved the eight teams which advanced from the group stage: the top two teams from each group and the two best third-placed teams.

In this stage, teams play against each other once. The losers of the semi-finals play against each other in the third place playoff where the winners are placed third overall in the entire competition and receive US$ 10,000. The winners of the final receive US$30,000 and the runners-up US$20,000.

Match rules

Quarter-finals, third place playoff and final
 Regulation time is 90 minutes.
 If scores are still level after regulation time, there will be no extra time and a Penalty shoot-out decides the winner.
 Each team is allowed to have seven named substitutes.
 Each team is allowed to make a maximum of three substitutions.

Semi-finals rules
 Regulation time is 90 minutes.
 If scores are still level after regulation time, there will be 30 minutes of extra time and a Penalty shoot-out thereafter if scores are still level after extra time to decide the winner.
 Each team is allowed to have seven named substitutes.
 Each team is allowed to make a maximum of three substitutions.

Bracket

Quarter-finals
The quarter-finals were played on 3–4 December 2012.

Semi-finals
The semi-finals were played on 6 December 2012.

Third place play-off

Final

Top scorers (at the knockout stage)

3 goals
  Robert Ssentongo

2 goals

  Mike Baraza
  Geoffrey Kizito

1 goal

  Edwin Lavatsa
  John Bocco
  Mwinyi Kazimoto
  Amri Kiemba
  Emmanuel Okwi
  Khamis Mcha Khamis
  Aggrey Morris
  Abdallah Othman

References

knockout stage